Ain't No 'Bout-A-Doubt It is the third album by Graham Central Station. Released in 1975, the album peaked at number four on the Billboard Top Soul Albums. The single, "Your Love", was a number-one hit on the Soul Singles chart.

Track listing 
All songs written by Larry Graham except where indicated

"The Jam"  8:14
"Your Love"  3:22
"It's Alright"  3:52
"I Can't Stand The Rain" (Ann Peebles, Don Bryant, Bernard "Bernie" Miller)  6:04
"It Ain't Nothing But a Warner Bros. Party" 	6:04 	
"Ole Smokey"  3:18
"Easy Rider" 	2:57 	
"Water" 	4:28 	
"Luckiest People"  3:47

Personnel 
Larry Graham - bass, synthesizer, drums, organ, Clavinet, timpani, lead and backing vocals
Hershall "Happiness" Kennedy - Clavinet, synthesizer, trumpet, vocals
Manuel "The Deacon" Kellough - drums
David "Dynamite" Vega - guitar, vocals
Robert "Butch" Sam -  organ, piano, vocals
Patryce "Choc'Let" Banks - drum programming [funk box], vocals

Charts

Singles

References

External links
 Graham Central Station-Ain't No 'Bout-A-Doubt It at Discogs

1975 albums
Graham Central Station albums
Warner Records albums
Albums recorded at Wally Heider Studios